Pulchrana is a genus of ranid frogs found in south-eastern Asia, Indonesia and the Philippines.

Species
The following species are recognised in the genus Pulchrana:

 Pulchrana banjarana (Leong and Lim, 2003)
 Pulchrana baramica (Boettger, 1900)
 Pulchrana centropeninsularis (Chan, Brown, Lim, Ahmad, and Grismer, 2014)
 Pulchrana debussyi (Van Kampen, 1910)
 Pulchrana fantastica Arifin, Cahyadi, Smart, Jankowski, and Haas, 2018
 Pulchrana glandulosa (Boulenger, 1882)
 Pulchrana grandocula (Taylor, 1920)
 Pulchrana guttmani (Brown, 2015)
 Pulchrana laterimaculata (Barbour and Noble, 1916)
 Pulchrana mangyanum (Brown and Guttman, 2002)
 Pulchrana melanomenta (Taylor, 1920)
 Pulchrana moellendorffi (Boettger, 1893)
 Pulchrana picturata (Boulenger, 1920)
 Pulchrana rawa (Matsui, Mumpuni, and Hamidy, 2012)
 Pulchrana siberu (Dring, McCarthy, and Whitten, 1990)
 Pulchrana signata (Günther, 1872)
 Pulchrana similis (Günther, 1873)

References

 
Amphibian genera